The 2018 San Benedetto Tennis Cup was a professional tennis tournaments played on clay courts. It was the 14th edition of the tournament which was part of the 2018 ATP Challenger Tour. The event took place in San Benedetto del Tronto, Italy, from 16 to 22 July 2018.

Singles entrants

Seeds 

 1 Rankings as of 2 July 2018.

Other entrants 
The following players received wildcards into the singles main draw:
  Riccardo Balzerani
  Thomaz Bellucci
  Jacopo Berrettini
  Andrea Pellegrino

The following player received entry into the singles main draw as a special exempt:
  Ulises Blanch

The following player received entry into the singles main draw as an alternate:
  Benjamin Bonzi

The following players received entry from the qualifying draw:
  Grégoire Jacq
  Pietro Rondoni
  Juan Pablo Varillas
  Andrea Vavassori

Champions

Singles 

  Daniel Elahi Galán def.  Sergio Gutiérrez Ferrol 6–2, 3–6, 6–2.

Doubles

  Julian Ocleppo /  Andrea Vavassori def.  Sergio Galdós /  Federico Zeballos 6–3, 6–2.

References

San Benedetto Tennis Cup
2018
2018 in Italian tennis